Beatriz Colomina (born 1952) is an architecture historian, theorist and curator. She is the founding director of the Program in Media and Modernity at Princeton University, the Howard Crosby Butler Professor of the History of Architecture and Director of Graduate studies (PhD program) in the School of Architecture.

Early life and education 
Colomina is from Valencia and she began her initial studies of Architecture in Technical university of Valencia. But she later moved to Escola Técnica Superior de Arquitectura de Barcelona, Universidad Politécnica de Barcelona, to complete her education. Here, her interests in History, Theory & Urbanism were nurtured under the guidance of a group of teachers that included Josep Quetglas and Ignasi de Solà-Morales. Even as a student, she began working for the Department of History, Theory and Urbanism by translating two of Tafuri's writings, with an Italian friend. Shortly after her graduation, she was hired by the Department of Urbanism. Her acquaintance with Richard Sennett lead to a fellowship in New York Institute for the Humanities and she moved to the USA in 1981. The people she met at this interdisciplinary institute, like Carl Schorske, Susan Sontag and Wolfgang Schivelbusch had a major influence in her later work.

Career 
Colomina has built a multifaceted career by working extensively under the forums of academia, publishing and exhibitions.

Academia 
She began her teaching at the age of 23, in Barcelona immediately after her graduation. After a short break, during which she served the fellowship at the New York Institute for the Humanities, her teaching career continued when she moved to Columbia University in 1982. She later moved to Princeton University in 1988 and continues teaching there.

Besides her role as a tenured professor, she has lectured extensively. She has lectured at the Museum of Modern Art in NYC, the Architectural Institute of Japan, Guggenheim in NY, the Center for Contemporary Art and Architecture in Stockholm, the DIA Art Foundation in NY, Tate Britain in London, Harvard University, Yale University, Columbia University, ETH in Zurich, Delft University, Bauhaus University in Weimar, Middle East Technical University in Ankara, Lebanese American University, University of Beirut, and Seoul University. She serves on the advisory board of several institutions.

She was awarded the 2020 Ada Louise Huxtable Prize.

Awards/ Fellowships 
2020 Ada Louise Huxtable Prize

2007 Canadian Centre for Architecture Mellon Fellowship

2005 Princeton University President's Award for Distinguished Teaching

1995-1996 Samuel H. Kress Senior Fellowship at the CASVA

1987 Graham Foundation Grant

SOM Foundation

Le Corbusier Foundation

The American Academy in Berlin and the Getty Center in Los Angeles

Publishing 
Colomina has written about architecture and the modern institutions of representation, particularly the printed media, photography, advertising, film and TV. Her books have received recognitions including International Book Award by the American Institute of Architects for Sexuality and Space (1993) & Privacy and Publicity (1995).

Some of her early contributions to other publications include The Sex of Architecture (Abrams, 1996), Dan Graham (2001), Philip Johnson: The Constancy of Change (2009), Cold War Hothouses (2004), Raumplan Versus Plan Libre: Adolf Loos and Le Corbusier (1988). She has authored numerous articles and has been on the editorial board of such periodicals as Assemblage, Daidalos, and Grey Room.

Exhibitions 
Colomina has curated, often in collaboration with her students, a number of international exhibitions.

Clip/Stamp/Fold (2006) 
An exhibition created by Colomina as a provocation in itself and as an exploration of the relationship between architecture and media. It is the outcome of research work taken up with her students at Princeton on 'little magazines of the 1960s and 70s'. This exhibition was originally held at New York's Storefront for Art and Architecture in 2006. It has since traveled to many locations worldwide, including the Canadian Centre for Architecture in Montreal in 2007; the Architectural Association in London in 2008; and the GAM Cultural Centre in Santiago de Chile in 2013.

Playboy Architecture: 1953-1979 (2012) 
The exhibition showcased how the fields of Architecture and Design helped shape the Playboy Fantasy and how the Playboy magazine helped spread new and radical architectural ideas. It was displayed in the Netherlands at Bureau Europa (Maastricht) in 2012 and at Elmhurst Art Museum, Elmhurst, Illinois in 2016.

Radical Pedagogies: Reconstructing Architectural Education (2014) 
The exhibition is the result of an on-going collaborative research project with her doctoral students at Princeton. The research focuses on architectural educational programs and schools that emerged post war and were strongly tied to the social changes of that time. It was first displayed in the Monditalia section of the Venice Biennale 2014 and has been exhibited in several locations since.

Curatorship 
Colomina was the chief curator of Curated by Vienna: The Century of the Bed in Vienna in 2014 and was co-curator of the third Istanbul Design Biennial (2016) on the theme Are We Human? The Design of the Species. She exhibited an installation at the inaugural biennale of Architecture and Urbanism in Seoul in 2017.

Personal life
Beatriz Colomina is married to New Zealand born architect and author Mark Wigley, who has collaborated with her on several occasions.

Bibliography 
 X-Ray Architecture, Lars Müller Publishers, 2019. 
 Are We Human? Notes on an Archeology of Design, (with Mark Wigley), Lars Müller Publishers, 2019. 
 Das Andere/The Other: A Journal for the Introduction of Western Culture into Austria, MAK Center for Art and Architecture, 2016. 
 The Century of the Bed, Verlag für Moderne Kunst, 2015. 
 Manifesto Architecture: The Ghost of Mies, Sternberg Press, 2014. 
 Clip/Stamp/Fold: The Radical Architecture of Little Magazines 196X-197X, Actar, 2010. 
 Domesticity at War, The MIT Press, 2007. 
 Privacy and Publicity: Modern Architecture as Mass Media, The MIT Press, 1994. 
 Sexuality and Space, Princeton Architectural Press, 1992. 
Wilkinson, Tom. 2020. “Ada Louise Huxtable Prize - Beatriz Colomina : The Internationally Acclaimed Feminist Writer Shines a Spotlight on Sexual Prejudice and Representation in Architecture.” Architectural Review, no. 1469 (March): 108–111.

References

External links

Official Pages 
 https://soa.princeton.edu/content/beatriz-colomina
 https://mitpress.mit.edu/contributors/beatriz-colomina

Published Articles 

Colomina, B. (1999). Couplings. Rearrangements, A Smithson's Celebration, OASE, (51), 20–33. 
"The 24/7 Bed". WORK, BODY, LEISURE. 2018-04-03.

Lectures 

 Work Marathon 2018, Serpentine Galleries, 2019.
 Broadcasting Yourself – Social Media Urbanism with response by Kieran Long, ArkDes, 2018.
 The Secret Life of Modern Architecture or We don't need another hero, Harvard GSD, 2018.
 Towards a Radical Pedagogy, The University of Edinburgh, 2017.
 Architecture as Mass Media, Vitra Design Museum, 2016.
 Privacy and Publicity, AA School of Architecture, 2015.
 Radical Pedagogies, Strelka Institute, 2014.
 Double Exposure: Architecture as a machine to See, AA School of Architecture, 2012.

Interviews 

 https://www.architectmagazine.com/design/playboy-magazine-and-the-architecture-of-seduction_o
 https://www.youtube.com/watch?v=DgTjGJ64xco
 https://frieze.com/article/x-ray-architecture
 https://www.youtube.com/watch?v=PVydYMz5H7s

Reviews/Mentions 

 "We should think very seriously about what a bed is today" says Beatriz Colomina". Dezeen. 2018-10-12. 
 Kaminer, T. 2009, Framing Colomina
 "Harvard Design Magazine: Sexuality and Space edited by Beatriz Colomina". www.harvarddesignmagazine.org
 "The Staging of Healthy Living: a Review of Beatriz Colomina's X-Ray Architecture". Archinect.

American architectural historians
Living people
Spanish academics
Spanish emigrants to the United States
American women historians
Columbia University faculty
Princeton University faculty
1952 births
21st-century American women writers